Taq-e Pol (also Romanized as Ţāq-e Pol) is a village in Mamulan Rural District, Mamulan District, Pol-e Dokhtar County, Lorestan Province, Iran. At the 2006 census, its population was 217, in 45 families.

References 

Towns and villages in Pol-e Dokhtar County